Arthur Severn  (23 June 1893 – 10 January 1949) was an English cricketer who played first-class cricket for Derbyshire in 1919 and 1920.

Severn was born at Alfreton, Derbyshire. He joined the nursery staff at Derby in 1914, but in the First World War served with the Coldstream Guards. He made his debut for Derbyshire in the 1919 season against Lancashire in May. In his second match against Leicestershire, opening the batting with Leonard Oliver, he made his top score of 73 in a game Derbyshire won by 9 wickets. Subsequently, as his performance failed to live up to his initial promise, he found himself slipping down the batting order as the season progressed. He played three matches at the start of the 1920 season before he severed his connection with Derbyshire and went to live at Stainforth, near Doncaster.

Severn played 24 innings in 13 first-class matches with a top score of 73 and an average of 15.50.

Severn died at Stainforth at the age of 55.

References

1893 births
1949 deaths
Derbyshire cricketers
English cricketers